Jan-Philipp Rabente (born 3 July 1987) is a German field hockey player who plays as a defender or midfielder for UHC Hamburg and the German national team.

At the 2012 Summer Olympics, he competed for the national team in the men's tournament. In January 2020, he won the European Indoor Championship with the national indoor hockey team by defeating Austria in the final.

References

External links
 
 
 
 

1987 births
Living people
Sportspeople from Essen
German male field hockey players
Male field hockey defenders
Male field hockey midfielders
2010 Men's Hockey World Cup players
Field hockey players at the 2012 Summer Olympics
2014 Men's Hockey World Cup players
Olympic field hockey players of Germany
Olympic gold medalists for Germany
Olympic medalists in field hockey
Medalists at the 2012 Summer Olympics
HTC Uhlenhorst Mülheim players
Uhlenhorster HC players
21st-century German people